Andrea Della Corte was an Italian musicologist and critic. Born in Naples on 5 April 1883, Della Corte studied law at the University of the native city, but was self-taught in music. After some short experiences in Neapolitan papers (initially at the Don Marzio, then at Il Mattino), he moved to Turin, where he was music critic  for La Stampa from 1919 to May 1967. He brought the music journalism in Italy to a level of «professionalism hitherto unknown». In Turin, Della Corte also taught history of music, both at the Conservatory (1926–53) and at the University (1939–53).

His main interests were the comic opera of the 18th century, Gluck and Verdi. Della Corte wrote many essays and articles, and 35 books, published both in Italy and abroad, many of them considered of fundamental importance for the modern musicology, characterised by a severe musical judgment and by the attempt to innovate the world of the Italian musical studies. He was a member of important musical and cultural institutions (Accademia dei Lincei, Accademia dei Cherubini in Florence, Accademia Nazionale di Santa Cecilia in Rome, Istituto Italiano per la Storia della Musica).

Della Corte died in Turin on 12 March 1968, aged 84. The city of Turin dedicated to Andrea Della Corte the music section of the Civic Library, to which his family, after his death, donated over 15,000 books.

Works
Paisiello: Settecento italiano - Turin, Fratelli Bocca, 1922
L'opera comica italiana nel '700 : studi ed appunti - Bari, Laterza, 1923 (2 volumes)
Le opere di Giuseppe Verdi. 1: Aida. Guida attraverso il dramma e la musica - Milan, Bottega di Poesia, 1923
Le opere di Giuseppe Verdi. 2: Otello. Guida attraverso il dramma e la musica - Milan, Bottega di Poesia, 1924
Nicolò Piccinni - Bari, 1928
Scelta di musiche per lo studio della storia - Milan, Ricordi, 1928
Disegno storico dell'arte musicale. Con esempi - Turin, Paravia, 1931
La vita musicale di Goethe. Con ritratti e musiche - Turin, Paravia, 1932
Canto e bel canto - Turin, 1933
Le teorie delle origini della musica e le musiche dei popoli antichi o primitivi : tesi per gli allievi delle scuole musicali secondo i nuovi programmi governativi - Turin, Paravia, 1932
Ritratto di Franco Alfano - Turin, 1935
 with Guido Pannain - Vincenzo Bellini : il carattere morale, i caratteri artistici - Turin, Paravia, 1935
Un italiano all'estero: Antonio Salieri. Con 70 inedite citazioni musicali - Turin, Paravia, 1936
Pergolesi - Turin, 1936
Giuseppe Verdi - Turin, Arione, 1938
Tre secoli di opera italiana - Turin, 1938
Le relazioni storiche della poesia e della musica italiana: elementari notizie di storia della musica per il liceo classico e scientifico e per l'istituto magistrale - Turin, Paravia, 1940
Rigoletto; il Trovatore; la Traviata di Giuseppe Verdi - Milan, Istituto d'alta cultura, 1943
 with Guido Gatti - Dizionario di musica. Illustrato con riproduzioni di oltre 80 ritratti e 70 istrumenti - Turin, Paravia, 1944
Satire e grotteschi di musiche e di musicisti d'ogni tempo. Con caricature antiche e moderne e disegni di P. A. Gariazzo - Turin, UTET (Unione Tipografico-Editrice Torinese), 1946
Gluck e i suoi tempi - Florence, Sansoni, 1948
L'interpretazione musicale e gli interpreti - Turin, UTET (Unione Tipografico-Editrice Torinese), 1951
 with Guido Pannain - Storia della musica - Turin, UTET (Unione Tipografico-Editrice Torinese), 1952 (3 volumes)
 Toscanini visto da un critico - Turin, ILTE (Industria Libraria Tipografica Editrice), 1952 (reprint: Arturo Toscanini - Pordenone, Studio Tesi, 1981)
 with Marziano Bernardi - Gli strumenti musicali nei dipinti della Galleria degli Uffizi - Rome, ERI-Edizioni Radio Italiana, 1952
 with Alpheus Hyatt Mayor, Mercedes Viale and Anton Giulio Bragaglia - Tempi e aspetti della scenografia - Rome, ERI-Edizioni Radio Italiana, 1954
 with Guglielmo Barblan - Mozart in Italia - Milan, Ricordi, 1956
 Tutto il teatro di Mozart - Roma, ERI-Edizioni Radio Italiana, 1957
 Drammi per musica dal Rinuccini allo Zeno - Turin, 1958 
 La critica musicale e i critici - Turin, UTET (Unione Tipografico-Editrice Torinese), 1961

References
Notes

Sources

External links
 

1883 births
1968 deaths
20th-century Italian musicologists